Imran Mir (born 30 September 2001) is an Afghan cricketer. He made his first-class debut for Mis Ainak Region in the 2017–18 Ahmad Shah Abdali 4-day Tournament on 20 October 2017. He made his Twenty20 debut on 12 October 2019, for Kabul Eagles in the 2019 Shpageeza Cricket League.

In December 2019, he was named in Afghanistan's squad for the 2020 Under-19 Cricket World Cup.

References

External links
 

2001 births
Living people
Afghan cricketers
Mis Ainak Knights cricketers
Place of birth missing (living people)